Daniel Joseph Petry (born November 13, 1958) is an American former Major League Baseball pitcher for the Detroit Tigers (1979–87 and 1990–91), California Angels (1988–89), Atlanta Braves (1991) and Boston Red Sox (1991). He currently serves as a studio analyst for the Detroit Tigers on Bally Sports Detroit.

Playing career
Petry helped the Tigers win the 1984 World Series and the 1987 American League Eastern Division, and helped the Braves win the 1991 National League pennant. He was elected to the American League All-Star team in 1985. He led the American League in games started (38) in 1983. In 1982 and 1984, Petry finished ninth and fifth, respectively, in American League Cy Young Award voting.

In 13 years he had a 125-104 record (.546), 370 appearances, 300 games started, 52 complete games, 11 shutouts, one save,  innings pitched, 1,984 hits allowed, 1,025 runs allowed, 912 earned runs allowed, 218 home runs allowed, 852 walks allowed, 1,063 strikeouts, 47 hit batsmen, 77 wild pitches, seven balks and a 3.95 earned run average.

Petry only appeared in 13 games as a Red Sox, but in 1991, that is where he ended his career. Used strictly as a relief pitcher, he managed to pick up his one and only MLB save. It came on September 30, 1991 against the Brewers. Petry pitched 1 2/3 scoreless innings to close out a wild 9-8 Red Sox victory over the Brewers.

Defensively, Petry was an above average fielding pitcher, posting a .980 fielding percentage, committing only 12 errors in 603 total chances, which was 23 points higher than the league average at his position.

Post-playing career
In 2012, Petry served as a substitute color analyst for the Detroit Tigers Radio Network, teaming with play-by-play announcer Dan Dickerson for several road games while regular analyst Jim Price recuperated from health problems. In 2022, he resumed filling in for Price while the Tigers were on the road.

On January 15, 2019, Petry was named a studio analyst for the Detroit Tigers on Bally Sports Detroit.

Personal life
Petry and his wife, Christine have two sons, Matt, who is the head coach of the Orchard Lake St. Mary’s baseball team, who have won three Michigan High School Athletic Association championships under Petry, and Jeff, who currently is a defenseman for the Pittsburgh Penguins of the National Hockey League. Petry attended El Dorado High School in Placentia, California, where he was a CIF championship winning pitcher.

References

External links

Dan Petry at Baseball Library
Dan Petry Facts, Biography & Chronology at This Day In Baseball  

1958 births
American League All-Stars
Atlanta Braves players
Baseball players from California
Boston Red Sox players
Bristol Tigers players
California Angels players
Detroit Tigers announcers
Detroit Tigers players
Evansville Triplets players
Lakeland Tigers players
Living people
Major League Baseball broadcasters
Major League Baseball pitchers
Montgomery Rebels players
Palm Springs Angels players
Sportspeople from Palo Alto, California